Arthur Jackson (6 January 1872 – 29 June 1935) was an Australian cricketer. He played one first-class match for Western Australia in 1898/99.

See also
 List of Western Australia first-class cricketers

References

External links
 

1872 births
1935 deaths
Australian cricketers
Western Australia cricketers